The following lists events that happened during 1969 in Australia.

Incumbents

Monarch – Elizabeth II
Governor-General – Lord Casey (until 30 April), then Sir Paul Hasluck
Prime Minister –  John Gorton
Deputy Prime Minister – John McEwen
Opposition Leader –  Gough Whitlam
Chief Justice – Sir Garfield Barwick

State and Territory Leaders
Premier of New South Wales – Robert Askin
Opposition Leader – Pat Hills
Premier of Queensland – Joh Bjelke-Petersen
Opposition Leader – Jack Houston
Premier of South Australia – Steele Hall
Opposition Leader – Don Dunstan
Premier of Tasmania – Eric Reece (until 26 May), then Angus Bethune
Opposition Leader – Angus Bethune (until 26 May), then Eric Reece
Premier of Victoria – Sir Henry Bolte
Opposition Leader – Clyde Holding
Premier of Western Australia – (Sir) David Brand
Opposition Leader – John Tonkin

Governors and Administrators
Governor of New South Wales – Sir Roden Cutler
Governor of Queensland – Sir Alan Mansfield
Governor of South Australia – Major General Sir James Harrison
Governor of Tasmania – Lieutenant General Sir Edric Bastyan
Governor of Victoria – Major General Sir Rohan Delacombe
Governor of Western Australia – Major General Sir Douglas Kendrew
Administrator of Norfolk Island – Robert Dalkin
Administrator of the Northern Territory – Roger Dean
Administrator of Papua and New Guinea – David Hay

Events
 8 January - Bushfires across Victoria claim the lives of 23 people including 17 who died when a grass fire overran a group of cars on the Princes Highway at Lara, near Geelong in Victoria. About 280 fires in total burned 250,000 hectares, destroyed 230 homes and dozens of other buildings, killing 12,000 head of stock.
 7 February – The Violet Town railway disaster: the Southern Aurora passenger train collides head-on with a freight train. Nine people are killed.
 30 April – Sir Paul Hasluck becomes Governor-General of Australia after the retirement of Lord Casey.
 10 May – The 1969 Tasmanian election is held, resulting in a hung parliament with the Australian Labor Party and Liberals winning 17 seats each. The deadlock is broken when Kevin Lyons of the Centre Party forms a coalition government with the Liberals and becomes Deputy Premier under Angus Bethune.
 12 May – The Age newspaper in Melbourne begins the process of moving from Collins Street to Spencer Street. The move is completed on 6 October.
 3 June – Melbourne-Evans collision – The Royal Australian Navy aircraft carrier HMAS Melbourne collides with the United States Navy destroyer USS Frank E. Evans in the South China Sea. Frank E. Evans is cut in half and sinks, killing 74 crew.
 19 June – The Commonwealth Conciliation and Arbitration Commission rules that equal pay for women doing the same work as men must be phased in by 1972.
 26 September – The Poseidon bubble begins when the small mining company Poseidon NL discovers a large nickel deposit in Laverton, Western Australia.
 25 October – 1969 Australian federal election: The Coalition Gorton government is narrowly re-elected with a sharply reduced majority, defeating a resurgent Labor Party led by Gough Whitlam.
 7 November – A Liberal Party leadership spill is held, with Prime Minister Gorton re-elected as party leader over challengers William McMahon and David Fairbairn.
 11 November – Prime Minister Gorton makes the most sweeping changes to the Federal Ministry since the Liberal-Country Party Coalition took office in 1949. Seven back-benchers are promoted to the junior ministry, four junior ministers promoted to cabinet, and three ministers dropped altogether. Treasurer McMahon was moved to External Affairs, and replaced by Les Bury. Future prime minister Malcolm Fraser was promoted to Minister for Defence.
 13 November - Former Minister for Air, Dudley Erwin, expresses to journalists his belief that Prime Minister Gorton's young secretary, Ainsley Gotto, was responsible for him being dropped from his ministerial position. Erwin also asserted Gotto severely restricted access to Gorton which he and other ministers had previously enjoyed. When asked what political manoeuvre had been used to get him out of office, he replied "it's shapely, it wiggles, it's cold-blooded and its name is Ainsley Gotto".
Victorian SEC workers strike for 24 hours from midnight for the fourth time this year, causing widespread disruption to power supplies.
 29 November – The rebuilding of the Sydney-Perth rail corridor to standard gauge is completed.
 16 December – Prime Minister John Gorton announces that a withdrawal of Australian Army troops from the Vietnam War would begin in 1970.

Science and technology
20 July – NASA switches the main transmission feed of the Apollo 11 moon landing to Honeysuckle Creek Tracking Station in Canberra, then Parkes Observatory in New South Wales, which then broadcasts the mission to the world.

Arts and literature

 4 May – An Australian production of the rock musical Hair opens in Sydney. Produced by Harry M. Miller, it features the debut of young American singer Marcia Hines.
George Johnston's novel Clean Straw for Nothing wins the Miles Franklin Award

Film
27 March – 2000 Weeks (directed by Tim Burstall) is released. The film was one of the first features of the modern era in Australian cinema, although it was received poorly both critically and commercially.

Television
 5 March – The last episode of spy series Hunter is aired.
 11 March – Police procedural drama series Division 4 makes its debut on the Nine Network.
 21 March – Graham Kennedy wins the Gold Logie for In Melbourne Tonight.

Sport
21 January – Boxer Johnny Famechon becomes world featherweight champion, when he defeats Cuban Jose Legra in a bout at the Albert Hall in London.
12 April – Carlton achieve the first double-century VFL score when they kick 30.30 (210) against Hawthorn, beating a previous record from 1931.
6 September – Richmond sets a new record VFL finals winning margin when it beats Geelong by 118 points. it is the first century winning margin in a finals match and beats the previous record margin of 88 points by Melbourne against Collingwood in the 1964 Second Semi.
20 September – Balmain defeated South Sydney 11–2 in the NSWRL Rugby League Grand Final at the Sydney Cricket Ground. It is Balmain's first premiership win since 1947, and would become their final win as the Balmain Tigers; they would later win in 2005 after their merger with the Western Suburbs Magpies to form the Wests Tigers. Cronulla-Sutherland finish in last position, claiming the wooden spoon.
27 September – Richmond 12.13 (85) beats Carlton 8.12 (60) for its seventh premiership.
2 October – Tennis player Rod Laver beats fellow Australian Tony Roche in the men's singles final of the U.S. Open, achieving his second Grand Slam (having also won the Australian Open, the French Open and Wimbledon in that year).
11 October – John Farrington wins his first men's national marathon title, clocking 2:21:02.8 in Sydney.
4 November – Rain Lover wins the Melbourne Cup.

Births
 19 January – Luc Longley, basketball player
 22 January – Shelley Sandie, basketball player
 23 January – Danielle Woodhouse, water polo player
 7 February – Fiona Robinson, basketball and handball player
 3 March – Tony Modra, Australian Rules football player
 13 March – Jamie Cox, cricketer
 15 March – Matthew Morris, politician
 17 March – Alison Forman, football (soccer) midfielder
 28 March – John Brogden, politician
 1 April – Andrew Vlahov, basketball player
 3 April – Ben Mendelsohn, actor
 7 May – Rachael Robertson (writer), speaker, author and mentor
 14 May – Cate Blanchett, actress
 17 May – Liesl Tesch, wheelchair basketball player, sailor and politician
 31 May – Juliet Haslam, field hockey defender
 3 June – Dean Pay, Australian rugby league player
 30 June – Mark Garner, track and field sprinter
 7 July – Rina Bradshaw-Hill, triathlete
July 17  – Jason Clarke, Australian actor
 30 July – Simon Baker, actor
 15 August – Bernard Fanning, singer
 16 August – Jodi McKay, politician
 6 September – Michellie Jones, triathlete
 7 September – David Borger, politician
 9 September – Natasha Stott Despoja, politician
 13 September – Shane Warne, cricketer (d. 2022)
 18 September – Brad Beven, triathlete
 19 September – Kostya Tszyu, boxer
 20 October – Laurie Daley, rugby league football commentator and former player
 31 October – Kylie Kwong, chef and television presenter
 11 December – Karl von Möller, director, cinematographer
 14 December – Dave Nilsson, baseball player
 14 December – Rob Oakeshott, politician
 29 December – Andrew Cornwell, politician

Deaths
 18 January – Gregory Brain (born 1893), politician
 29 January – Alfred McClelland (born 1886), politician
 31 March – Ernest Wetherell, politician
 14 May – Frederick Lane (born 1888), swimmer
 3 August – Alexander Mair (born 1889), 26th Premier of New South Wales (1939–1941)
 25 August – Robert Cosgrove (born 1894), 30th Premier of Tasmania (1939–1947, 1948–1958)
 17 November – Sir Malcolm Barclay-Harvey (born 1890), 22nd Governor of South Australia (1939–1944)
 21 November – Norman Lindsay (born 1879), artist
 27 November – May Gibbs, (born 1877) children's author.

See also
 List of Australian films of the 1960s

References

 
Australia
Years of the 20th century in Australia